Terenura is a genus of insectivorous passerine birds in the antbird family, Thamnophilidae.

The genus was erected by the German ornithologists Jean Cabanis and Ferdinand Heine in 1860 with the streak-capped antwren as the type species. The name of the genus comes from the Ancient Greek words terēn for "soft" and oura for "tail".

The genus contains two species:

 Streak-capped antwren (Terenura maculata)
 Orange-bellied antwren (Terenura sicki)

The genus formerly included an additional four species but these were moved to the newly erected genus Euchrepomis based on the results of a genetic study published in 2012.

References

 
Bird genera
 
Taxa named by Jean Cabanis
Taxa named by Ferdinand Heine
Taxonomy articles created by Polbot